Bramrachokh in Kashmiri legend is a mythical being who inhabits desolate areas and fools travellers by pretending to be a light. He is a monster with a fire pot balanced on his head. On his forehead, is a strong, shining eye. It is thought that late travellers frequently encounter this light in remote locations, which causes them to either ditch or cave. Children frequently sit by their windows in villages, casting glances at distant locations where light burns and extinguishes, and calling out to their friends to watch "Rahchok."

See also
 Chillai Kalan
 Rantas
 Pasik dar

References 

Kashmiri culture
South Asian legendary creatures